CIA Code Name: Alexa is a 1992 action film, starring Lorenzo Lamas and his then wife Kathleen Kinmont. It was directed by Joseph Merhi. It was followed by a sequel, CIA II: Target Alexa (1993).

Plot 
CIA Special Agent Mark Graver (Lorenzo Lamas) is a man of action. Graver gets the assignment of a lifetime when he goes up against a gang of terrorists led by Victor Mahler (Alex Cord). These terrorists shoot up churches and kill cops. They want a microchip with nuclear weapons information. To get them, Mahler must get a hold of “The Microchip!”

Cast 
 Lorenzo Lamas as CIA Agent Mark Graver
 Kathleen Kinmont as Alexa
 O. J. Simpson as Detective Nick Murphy
 Alex Cord as Victor Mahler
 Pamela Dixon as CIA Chief Robin (Credited as Pam Dixon)
 Jeff Griggs as Detective Benedetti
 Michael Bailey Smith as Vlad
 Stephen Quadros as Max Mahler
 Shonna Cobb as Tanya
 Clayton Staggs as Captain O'Neil
 H. Ray Huff as Commander
 Dan Tullis Jr. as Terrorist
 Charles Meshack as Reverend 
 Jim Ishida as Guest

See also 
 CIA II: Target Alexa

References

External links
 CIA Code Name: Alexa Echo Bridge Entertainment

1993 films
American action films
1990s English-language films
1993 action films
Films directed by Joseph Merhi
Films scored by Louis Febre
1990s American films